Outside is the fourth album by gothic country band O'Death.

Track listing

Personnel
Greg Jamie - vocals, guitar
Gabe Darling - backing vocals, ukulele, guitar, banjo
David Rogers-Berry - drums, whoop
Bob Pycior - fiddle, guitar
Jesse Newman - bass
Dan Sager - euphonium
Sarah Balliet - cello on "Look at the Sun"

References

2011 albums
O'Death albums